Halichoeres iridis is a species of wrasse native to the western Indian Ocean along the African coast and nearby islands. This species can reach  in total length. It can be found in the aquarium trade.

References

iridis
Taxa named by John Ernest Randall
Taxa named by Margaret Mary Smith
Fish described in 1982